Ma vérité is a 2005 album recorded by French singer Johnny Hallyday. It was released on 6 November 2005, and achieved huge success in France and Belgium (Wallonia), where it topped the charts. It provided three top ten singles in France : "Ma religion dans son regard" (#2), "Mon Plus Beau Noël" (#1) and "Le temps passe" (#4). French acts Kyo, Zazie, Passi and Stomy Bugsy participated in the composition of several tracks of the album.

Track listing
 "S'il n'est pas trop tard" (Jérôme Attal, Daran) — 3:06
 "Ma religion dans son regard" (Benoit Poher, Kyo) — 3:50
 "La paix" (Zazie, Fabien Cahen) — 3:23
 "Le temps passe" (Passi, Stomy Bugsy, Elio) (with Ministère A.M.E.R.) — 4:40
 "Si tu pars" (Yanne) — 4:06
 "Clémence" (Guillaume Ledoux, Johan Ledoux) — 3:27
 "Ce qui ne tue pas nous rend plus fort" (Guy Carlier, Fred Blondin) — 3:17
 "Mon Plus Beau Noël" (Fred Blondin) — 4:22
 "Te savoir près de moi" ( J.Jaillet, A.L Vaissière, A.Auclair) — 3:53
 "Ma Vérité" (David Salsedo) — 3:15
 "Elle s'en moque" (Muriel Robin, Cyril Assous) — 4:01
 "Affronte-moi" (François Welgrin, David Hallyday) — 3:36
 "Apprendre à aimer" ( Johnny Hallyday, Michel Mallory) — 4:21

Source : Allmusic.

Releases

Certifications and sales

Charts

Weekly charts

Year-end charts

References

2005 albums
Johnny Hallyday albums